The 2011 Concurso Internacional de Tenis – San Sebastián was a professional tennis tournament played on clay courts. It was the fourth edition of the tournament which is part of the 2011 ATP Challenger Tour. It took place in San Sebastián, Spain between 15 and 21 August 2011.

ATP entrants

Seeds

 1 Rankings are as of August 8, 2011.

Other entrants
The following players received wildcards into the singles main draw:
  Albert Alcaraz Ivorra
  Iñigo Cervantes-Huegun
  Juan Lizariturry
  Gianni Mina

The following players received entry from the qualifying draw:
  Gorka Fraile
  Carlos Gómez-Herrera
  Miguel Ángel López Jaén
  Pedro Sousa

Champions

Singles

 Albert Ramos def.  Pere Riba 6–1, 6–2

Doubles

 Stefano Ianni /  Simone Vagnozzi def.  Daniel Gimeno Traver /  Israel Sevilla, 6–3, 6–4

External links
Official Website
ITF Search
ATP official site

 
San Sebastian
San Sebastian
Concurso Internacional de Tenis – San Sebastián